Wang Yan (256 – 5 May 311), courtesy name Yifu, was a Chinese politician. He served as a minister and was one of the pure conversation leaders of the Jin dynasty (266–420). During the reign of Emperor Hui of Jin, Wang Yan grew popular among the court for his mastery in Qingtan and for being a patron of Xuanxue. Wang Yan vacillated between the warring princes during the War of the Eight Princes until he ended up with Sima Yue, who gave him a considerable amount of power in his administration. After Yue died in April 311, Wang Yan led his funeral procession but was ambushed and later executed by the Han Zhao general, Shi Le at Ningping City (寧平; in modern Zhoukou, Henan). Though a bright scholar, Wang Yan was often associated by traditional historians as one of the root causes for Western Jin's demise due to his influential beliefs.

Early life and career 
Wang Yan was born in Langya commandery as part of the same Wang clan that his cousin Wang Rong, a member of the famous Seven Sages of the Bamboo Groves, came from. When he was 14 years old, he met with his uncle Yang Hu at Luoyang. Yang Hu and others were impressed with the way he spoke but Wang was very arrogant towards his uncle. He became the talk of the town, so much so that the minister Yang Jun wanted to marry him to his daughter. However, Wang Yan was not fond of Yang Jun, so he pretended to go mad to avoid him.

In 273, Emperor Wu of Jin was looking for talents to help safeguard the northern frontiers. Wang Yan loved to discuss military strategies and was particularly enthusiastic in talking about the "horizontal and vertical alliances (連橫/合縱)". For these reasons, he was recommended by Lu Qin (盧欽) to serve as the Administrator of Liaodong. Wang Yan was not pleased with his given position and refused to take it. It was then when Wang Yan decided to focus less on worldly affairs and dedicate his time on studying "Qingtan" or "Pure talks".

Wang Yan eventually left Luoyang to take up the post of Prefect of Yuanxiang  (苑鄕, in present-day Hebei and Beijing). After some time, he returned to the capital and served a series of offices, eventually reaching Gentleman-Attendant of the Yellow Gate. By 297, Wang Yan held the office of Prefect of the Masters of Writing, holding a significant amount of power in court at this time. He still regularly discusses Qingtan and further delved himself into Zhengshi era Xuanxue, particularly the teachings of the Cao Wei minister He Yan and his inner circle. He and another devotee, Yue Guang, were regarded as well-respected men and were thus able to spread their beliefs to the other ministers in the government. It was said that many of the ministers began neglecting their duties as they engage in excessive and absurd acts.

War of the Eight Princes 
In 299, Wang Yan became somewhat involved with the imperial family. Empress Jia Nanfeng, the paramount leader of Jin working behind her husband Emperor Hui of Jin, was becoming more cruel day by day. Her brother Jia Mo (賈模) plotted to assassinate her together with Pei Wei and Wang Yan. However, the plot was dropped after Wang Yan decided to pull out. Later, Wang Yan's younger daughter married the Crown Prince, Sima Yu but when Yu was reduced to a commoner and arrested by the Empress, Wang Yan had her divorced and refused to associate with him. His decision to do so backfired in 300 when Jia Nanfeng was overthrown and replaced by Sima Lun as regent. A group of minister submitted a petition accusing him of refusing to help Sima Yu to save his own life, and Wang Yan was barred from the government.

At the advice of his cousin, Wang Dun, Wang Yan sided with Sima Jiong in removing Sima Lun after he usurped the throne in 301 and returned to the government as Intendant of Henan. For the next few years of the War of the Eight Princes, Wang Yan appeared to have kept a neutral stance and was not closely affiliated with any of the warring princes. In 303, when Sima Ai (who became the new emperor's regent in 302) was besieged by Sima Ying's army in Luoyang, a group of ministers sent Wang Yan out to negotiate peace with Ying but ended in failure when Ying refused to accept it. The following year in 304, when Sima Yong removed Sima Ying as Crown Prince, Wang Yan was appointed by Yong as Supervisor of the Left of the Masters of Writing.

Service under Sima Yue's regency 
The Prince of Donghai, Sima Yue, was the last of the so-called Eight Princes to take control of the government in 306. Yue appointed Wang Yan Minister of Works in 307 and later Minister Over the Masses in 308. Although Yue had won the civil war, he must now face the growing threat of Han Zhao, a Xiongnu state that emerged in northern China during the war in 304. After his appointment, Wang Yan alerted Sima Yue that he should secure two places to run away to if the court were to fall. Wang Yan recommended he appoint his brother, Wang Cheng, as Inspector of Jingzhou and Wang Dun, as Inspector of Qingzhou. This was called the "three rabbit burrows strategy (狡兔三窟)". 

In 308, the powerful bandit, Wang Mi, aligned himself with Han Zhao and began marching towards Luoyang. Mi threw Qingzhou, Xuzhou, Yanzhou and Yuzhou into chaos and had Xuchang's armoury emptied for his soldiers. The court was greatly afraid as Wang Mi defeated the Jin forces at Huanyuan Pass. Sima Yue sent Wang Bin (王斌) while the Inspector of Liangzhou, Zhang Gui sent his general Beigong Chun to reinforce the capital. As Wang Mi's army were at the gates of Luoyang, an edict was passed to make Wang Yan the commander. Wang Yan, Wang Bin and Zhang Gui all went out to face Wang Mi with their army. Mi was greatly defeated and withdrew, but Wang Yan sent Wang Bing (王秉) to pursue him, dealing him another great defeat.

In 309, Wang Yan was made Grand Commandant to replace the retiring Liu Shi (劉寔). The next year in 310, Luoyang was suffering from a severe food shortage. Calls to reinforce the capital were met with silence. Many insisted that they move the capital instead to avoid both the famine and Han Zhao. However, Wang Yan did not think that was possible and sold his carriage and oxen to calm the people down. Later, Wang Yan became Sima Yue's Army Advisor.

Downfall and death 
In 311, tensions between Sima Yue and his powerful general Gou Xi reached its climax. Gou Xi, disgruntled at the fact that Sima Yue was believing in slanders regarding him, cooperated with Emperor Huai and retaliated against Yue. With Han Zhao growing day by day and now his strongest general turning on him, Yue was undergoing a severe amount of stress, and had Wang Yan to take over the handling of affairs. Yue died shortly after in Xiang county (項縣; present-day Shenqiu County, Henan) but Wang Yan and the others agreed to keep his death a secret.

Yue's heir, Sima Pi (司馬毗), was in Luoyang at the time, so the ministers all decided to elect Wang Yan as the new head for the time being. Wang was reluctant to take the lead and offered it to Sima Fan, but he too refused. In the end, they all decided that they should carry out a funeral for their late prince in Donghai first. However, the Han Zhao general, Shi Le, knew about their plans and sent his cavalries to ambush them in Ningping City. A great many of Jin officials and soldiers were killed while Wang Yan and the others were captured. The captured prisoners were all brought into Shi Le's camp for questioning regarding Jin's situation.

Shi Le had heard of Wang Yan's talents and was happy when he received him. When Wang Yan met with Shi Le, Wang thoroughly explained to him the causes of Jin's downfall, citing its lack of preparation against the likes of Shi Le as one of it. He downplayed his role in the government and even tried to curry Shi Le's favour by urging him to become emperor. However, Shi Le told him, "You have supported the court ever since you were young; your fame spreads throughout the Four Seas, and you occupy a very important office. How can you speak as though you were some nobody? If you are not the one responsible for wrecking the realm, then who is?"

Shi Le then scheduled the prisoners for execution. He initially wanted to have them executed by the sword but seeing Sima Fan's defiance and acceptance of death prompted him to give them a more dignified death by having his soldiers push over a wall to crush them. Before his death, Wang Yan was recorded to have lamented, "Though I am inferior to the ancients, had I not advocated vanity and devoted myself to bettering the state, I would not have suffer today." Later that year, Luoyang would fall to Han Zhao and Emperor Huai was taken captive.

Appraisals 
During his time, Wang Yan was favourably acclaimed by many for his knowledge of Qingtan and Xuanxue. His family members, Wang Rong, Wang Cheng, Wang Dun, and Wang Dao, had all made positive remarks in regard to him. Liu Na (劉訥), one of Shi Chong's "Twenty-Four Companions (二十四友)", once said, "Wang Yifu is too bright." There were those who were skeptical of him in spite of acknowledging his talents, however. Both Shan Tao and Yang Hu commented that while Wang was indeed intelligent, they feared that Wang might not use his strengths for the better good.

After the Disaster of Yongjia, Wang's reputation soured as many blamed him for being one of the reasons why Western Jin fell. The Jin general, Yu Yi wrote a letter to Yin Hao asking him to quit his life as a hermit and join the government. In it, he brings up Wang Yan who he criticized for neglecting government responsibilities in favour of philosophical discussions and failing to make a positive name for himself, much like what Yin Hao was doing at the time. During his 2nd northern expedition in 356, the Jin commander Huan Wen supposedly said, "For causing the Sacred Lands to fall into the hands of the enemies and lay it in ruins for a hundred years, Wang Yifu and his followers must bear this burden!"

Traditional historians and writers also cast a negative light on Wang Yan. Most of this stems from his association with Qingtan and Xuanxue. The Confucianist scholar, Fan Ning, made a very critical assessment against Wang, denouncing him of distorting the orthodox teachings of Confucius which in turn brought disaster to his dynasty. Some even extended Wang Yan's faults to He Yan and other followers of Neo-Taoism like Wang Rong and Ruan Ji. This hostile sentiment was shared by the Book of Jin and various famous writers from different dynasties such as Wei Yuanzhong, Su Shi, Wang Fuzhi and more.

The Chinese saying "Randomly speaking out orpiment (口中雌黃)" is attributed to him. Wang was prone to making mistakes whenever he spoke as he was always in a carefree and relaxed state of mind. Whenever this happened, he would calmly go back and say what he intended to say. Initially, this idiom simply referred to people who constantly have to repeat what they say to rectify themselves. Gradually, however, it was extended to refer to people who spout nonsense with no proof to back them up.

Note

References 

 Fang, Xuanling (ed.) (648). Book of Jin (Jin Shu).
 Sima, Guang (1084). Zizhi Tongjian.

256 births
311 deaths
Executed Jin dynasty (266–420) people
Jin dynasty (266–420) politicians